The Tooker Baronetcy, of Maddington in the County of Wiltshire, was a title in the Baronetage of England.  It was created on 1 July 1664 for Giles Tooker.  The title became extinct on his death in 1676.

Tooker baronets, of Maddington (1664)
Sir Giles Tooker, 1st Baronet (–1676)

References

Extinct baronetcies in the Baronetage of England